Edward Bennett may refer to:

 Edward Bennett (actor) (born 1979), English actor
 Edward Bennett (colonist) (1577–before 1651), established the first large plantation in the British North American colonies 
 Edward Bennett (director) (born 1950), British TV and film director
 Ted Bennett (footballer) (Edward Ernest Bennett, 1925–2018), English footballer
 Edward Bennett (footballer, born 1897) (1897–1957), English footballer
 Edward Bennett (mobster) (1919–1967), American mobster and loanshark; see 
 Edward Bennett (physicist), American physicist (wireless transmission)
 Edward Bennett (rower) (1915–1997), American Olympic rower
 Edward A. Bennett (1920–1983), Medal of Honor recipient
 Edward H. Bennett (1874–1954), American architect
 Edward Hallaran Bennett (1837–1907), Irish surgeon
 Edward Trusted Bennett  (1831–1908), English botanist and psychical researcher
 Edward Turner Bennett (1797–1836), English zoologist and writer
 Edward W. Bennett, American historian and winner of the George Louis Beer Prize in 1963 and 1979

See also
 Edward Bennett Rosa (1873–1921), American physicist (measurement systems)
 Edward Bennett Williams (1920–1988), American attorney